Kachka is a restaurant serving Russian cuisine in Portland, Oregon's Buckman neighborhood, in the United States.

History
Kachka was founded in 2014 and is owned by Israel and Bonnie Morales ( Frumkin). Bonnie, who serves as the head chef, was born in Chicago where her Belarusian parents ran a restaurant near Wrigley Field in the 1990s. 

In late 2019, they opened Kachka Lavka, a grocery and deli, in the mezzanine of the restaurant.

In 2020, Kachka opened a summer pop-up, Kachka Alfresca, which served 1990s-inspired comfort food. Kachka Alfresca closed in October 2020.

The restaurant implemented service fees, replacing optional tipping.

See also

 List of Russian restaurants

References

External links

 
 Kachka at Bon Appetit
 Kachka at Zomato

2014 establishments in Oregon
Asian restaurants in Portland, Oregon
Buckman, Portland, Oregon
European-American cuisine
European-American culture in Portland, Oregon
Restaurants established in 2014
Russian restaurants in the United States
Russian-American culture in Oregon
Year of establishment missing